Dead of Night is a British television anthology series of supernatural fiction, produced by the BBC and broadcast on BBC2 in 1972 over seven 50-minute episodes.

History
Dead of Night is considered by some to be a spiritual successor to an earlier horror anthology by the BBC, Late Night Horror. Like Late Night Horror, Dead of Night ran for a single series in the autumn of 1972.

Only the first, second and seventh episodes – "The Exorcism", "Return Flight", and "A Woman Sobbing" – are retained on their original 625 line PAL colour videotapes in the BBC Archives. The videotapes of "Bedtime", "Death Cancels All Debts", "Smith" and "Two in the Morning" were either erased for reuse or junked during the mid-1970s, and not even any 16mm black-and-white film telerecordings made for overseas sales are known to exist.

Another programme made by the Dead of Night production team under Innes Lloyd, The Stone Tape, running to 90 minutes and intended to be the eighth episode, also survives in the BBC Archives, but this was broadcast as a stand-alone story and not shown under the Dead of Night banner.

BBC Four re-broadcast "The Exorcism" on 22 December 2007.

The three surviving episodes of Dead of Night were released on DVD by the BFI in October 2013, with extras including a gallery of stills from the four missing episodes, the downloadable scripts for all episodes (surviving and missing); and a booklet featuring essays and biographies by Lisa Kerrigan, Oliver Wake, Derek Johnston and Alex Davidson.

Cast

"The Exorcism"

 Anna Cropper: Rachel
 Sylvia Kay: Margaret
 Edward Petherbridge: Edmund
 Clive Swift: Dan
 Kenneth Kendall: Newsreader

"Return Flight"

 Peter Barkworth: Captain Rolph
 Bernard Brown: Frank Warley
 Artro Morris: Samuels
 Diana Fairfax: Rosalind Warley
 Denis Lill: Froggat
 Anthony Dutton: Armstrong
 Karin MacCarthy: Zoe
 Barrie Fletcher: Arthur Shaw
 Christopher Denham: Radar controller
 Laurie Asprey: Ground controller
 Roger Avon: Police Inspector
 Candida Fawsitt: Linda
 Carl Bohen: Ernst
 Paul Bentley: Franz
 Hannah Kilpinen: Hilde

"Bedtime"

 Sarah Badel: Lorna
 Terrence Hardiman: Piers Wickett
 Sidney Johnson: Antique dealer
 Jacqueline Pearce: Sarah Hopkirk
 James Smillie: Keith Hopkirk
 Neil Stacy: Geoffrey Hamilton
 Yutte Stensgaard: Gertrud Wickett

"Death Cancels All Debts"

 David Baron: James Halt
 Lucy Griffiths: Florence
 Charles Lamb: Clockmender
 Graham Leaman: Mr. Simon
 Doris Littlewood: Mts. Walter
 Frank Littlewood: Mr. Walter
 Preston Lockwood: Mr. Denfield
 Sebastian Shaw: Powys Jubb
 Gladys Spencer: Mrs. Simon
 Nora Swinburne: Mariella Jubb
 Marjorie Wilde: Mrs. Denfield
 Katya Wyeth: Vanessa

"Smith"

 John Castle: Michael
 Christopher Hancock: Features editor
 Ruby Head: Mrs. Hunter
 Gwen Taylor: Tessa
 Stacey Tendeter: Anne
 John Gabriel: Scrutton
 Madi Head: Miss Blatch
 Gerald Cross: Voice
 Denis McCarthy: Voice
 Peter Gilmore: (role unknown)
 Jason Fithian: Major Smith

"Two in the Morning"

 Donald Douglas: Hazelhurst
 John Gregg: Partner
 Frederick Hall: Manager
 Peter Jeffrey: Wisbech
 John Nettleton: Grandman
 Ralph Nossek: Dr. Fortescue
 Andrea Allan: New secretary
 Vivienne Cohen, Pam Scotcher: Girls on bus
 Richard Dennis: Lofthouse
 Carrie Jones: Roberta
 Lois Kentish: Tea girl
 Annabelle Lee: Cashier
 Vivienne Martin: Jessie
 Judy Matheson: Tessa
 David Sinclair: Art teacher
 Bernice Spivack: Miss Levy
 Marianne Stone: Mrs. Firth
 Pauline Stroud: Mary

"A Woman Sobbing"

 Anna Massey: Jane Pullar
 Ronald Hines: Frank Pullar
 Julian Holloway: Sandy
 Yokki Rhodes: Inge
 Tommy Boyle: Gas fitter
 John Lee: Priest
 Margaret John: Fay
 John Graham: Philip
 David Whitworth, Jan Edwards: In the church hall
 Denis Gilmore: Fitter's mate
 Donna Reading: Secretary
 Elaine Elder: Dutch au pair
 Nicky Cox: Robin
 Craig McFarlane: James

Episodes

External links
Dead of Night at the BFI Film & TV Database
 
"The Exorcism" at BFI Screenonline

References 

1970s British drama television series
1972 British television series debuts
1972 British television series endings
BBC television dramas
1970s British anthology television series
British supernatural television shows
British horror fiction television series
Lost BBC episodes
English-language television shows